Kumlinge is a municipality consisting of a group of islands in Åland, an autonomous territory of Finland. Kumlinge, which is also the name of the largest island in the group, means "rocky passage."

 of the population is Swedish-speaking,  is Finnish-speaking, and  speak other languages.

The Kumlinge Airfield is situated on the main island.

History
The first visitors to Kumlinge were Vikings who stopped there during their voyages. The first permanent residents arrived in the 13th century. According to taxrolls from the 16th century there were about a dozen houses on the main island at the time, home to mostly farmers and fishermen. In the 20th century the population of Kumlinge slowly began to decline.

Demographics

Sights
 
The church in the village is dedicated to St. Anne and dates from the 15th century. There are two farm museums in Kumlinge: Hermas museigård and Sjölunds gårdsmuseum. There is also a memorial stone in Fälberget which is dedicated to the war of 1808 when a Russian battalion was defeated in the village of Kumlinge. The old post route also goes through Kumlinge. There is also an old but still operational pharmacy on Kumlinge with its old inventory.

References

External links
 
Municipality of Kumlinge – Official website
Map of Kumlinge

Municipalities of Åland